The three engines of DRG Class 99.22 were standard, narrow gauge locomotives (Einheitsloks) in service with the German Reichsbahn. They had operating numbers 99 221 to 99 223.

They were built and deployed for the railway line from Eisfeld to Schönbrunn. In 1944, during the course of the Second World War, locomotives 99 221 and 99 223 went to the Thamshavnbanen copper ore line in Norway. After the end of the war they stayed there and were later scrapped. Locomotive 99 222 remained on duty until 1966 on its original route, but when it became clear that the end was nigh, it transferred to the Harz and is in service today on the network of the Harz Narrow Gauge Railways (Harzer Schmalspurbahnen or HSB) between Nordhausen, Quedlinburg and Wernigerode.

In its time the Class 99.22 was the most powerful of the German narrow gauge locomotives and had Bissel axles. In addition the coal tank tapered toward the back. One feature was the Janney automatic centre buffer coupling. After its transfer to the Harzquerbahn, 99 222 was converted to the normal compensating coupling with central buffer. This conversion can be clearly recognised by the cutouts in the buffer beam.

The locomotives had a Walschaerts valve gear driving the third axle.

On the introduction of the DR's new EDP numbering scheme in 1970 the engine was given operating number 99 7222, which she carries to this day because the HSB has retained the DR numbering from 1970.

The new DR Class 99.23-24 locomotives were built on the basis of the Einheitsloks. Differences in the new engines are the feedwater heater and the bar frame.

 99 221 last duties: Thamshavnbanen (Norway) - scrapped in 1953
 99 222 in service with the HSB
 99 223 last duties: Thamshavnbanen (Norway) - scrapped in 1947

See also

 List of DRG locomotives and railbuses

References

External links 
 99 222 at the Selke valley railway

99.022
2-10-2T locomotives
99.22
Railway locomotives introduced in 1931
Metre gauge steam locomotives
Steam locomotives of Norway
Berliner locomotives
1′E1′ h2t locomotives
Freight locomotives